Lindsay De Vylder (born 30 May 1995) is a Belgian cyclist, who currently rides for UCI ProTeam .

He competed at the 2016 UEC European Track Championships in the team pursuit and scratch events.

Major results

Track

2013
 1st  Omnium, UEC European Junior Championships
 National Junior Championships
1st  Individual pursuit
1st  Points race
1st  Scratch
1st  Omnium
1st  Kilometer
1st  Team pursuit
1st  Team sprint
2014
 3rd Scratch, National Championships
2017
 UEC European Under-23 Championships
1st  Madison (with Robbe Ghys)
2nd  Team pursuit
 2016–17 UCI World Cup
2nd Omnium, Cali
 National Championships
2nd Madison
2nd Omnium
2018
 2017–18 UCI World Cup
1st Madison, Milton (with Kenny De Ketele)
2019
 National Championships
1st  Madison (with Moreno De Pauw)
1st  Scratch
1st  Omnium
 2018–19 UCI World Cup
2nd Team pursuit, London
2021
 2nd  Madison (with Kenny De Ketele), UEC European Championships
2022
 1st Six Days of Ghent (with Robbe Ghys)
 1st Six Days of Rotterdam (with Jules Hesters)
 3rd  Madison (with Fabio Van den Bossche), UCI World Championships

Road
2013
 1st Mountains classification, Niedersachsen-Rundfahrt der Junioren
2016
 1st Stage 2 Ronde van Oost-Vlaanderen
2018
 9th Grote Prijs Jean-Pierre Monseré
2023
 5th Cholet-Pays de la Loire

References

External links

1995 births
Living people
Belgian male cyclists
Belgian track cyclists
People from Wetteren
Cyclists from East Flanders